The 1989 Hardy Cup was the 1989 edition of the Canadian intermediate senior ice hockey championship.

Final
Best of 7
Port-aux-Basques 6 Kindersley 5
Port-aux-Basques 10 Kindersley 5
Port-aux-Basques 6 Kindersley 5
Kindersley 5 Port-aux-Basques 3
Port-aux-Basques 7 Kindersley 2
Port-aux-Basques Mariners beat Kindersley Klippers 4–1 on series.

External links
Hockey Canada

Hardy Cup
Hardy